Richard Courant (January 8, 1888 – January 27, 1972) was a German American mathematician. He is best known by the general public for the book What is Mathematics?, co-written with Herbert Robbins. His research focused on the areas of real analysis, mathematical physics, the calculus of variations and partial differential equations. He wrote textbooks widely used by generations of students of physics and mathematics. He is also known for founding the institute now bearing his name.

Life and career
Courant was born in Lublinitz, in the Prussian Province of Silesia. His parents were Siegmund Courant and Martha Courant née Freund of Oels. Edith Stein was Richard's cousin on the maternal side. During his youth his parents moved often, including to Glatz, then to Breslau and in 1905 to Berlin. He stayed in Breslau and entered the university there, then continued his studies at the University of Zürich and the University of Göttingen. He became David Hilbert's assistant in Göttingen and obtained his doctorate there in 1910. He was obliged to serve in World War I, but was wounded shortly after enlisting and therefore dismissed from the military. Courant left the University of Münster in 1921 to take over Erich Heckes position at the University of Göttingen. There he founded the Mathematical Institute, which he headed as director from 1928 until 1933.

Courant left Germany in 1933, earlier than many Jewish escapees. He did not lose his position due to being Jewish, as his previous service as a front-line soldier exempted him; however, his public membership in the social-democratic left was reason enough (for the Nazis) for dismissal.

In 1936, after one year at Cambridge, Courant accepted a professorship at New York University in New York City. There he founded an institute for graduate studies in applied mathematics. The Courant Institute of Mathematical Sciences (as it was renamed in 1964) is now one of the most respected research centers in applied mathematics.

Courant and David Hilbert authored the influential textbook Methoden der mathematischen Physik, which, with its revised editions, is still current and widely used since its publication in 1924. With Herbert Robbins he coauthored a popular overview of higher mathematics, intended for the general public, titled What is Mathematics?. With Fritz John he also coauthored the two-volume work Introduction to Calculus and Analysis, first published in 1965.

Courant's name is also attached to the finite element method, with his numerical treatment of the plain torsion problem for multiply-connected domains, published in 1943.
This method is now one of the ways to solve partial differential equations numerically. Courant is a namesake of the Courant–Friedrichs–Lewy condition and the Courant minimax principle.

Courant was an elected member of both the American Philosophical Society (1953) and the United States National Academy of Sciences (1955).

Courant died of a stroke in New Rochelle, New York on January 27, 1972.

Perspective on mathematics
Commenting upon his analysis of experimental results from in-laboratory soap film formations, Courant explained why the existence of a physical solution does not obviate mathematical proof. Here is a quote from Courant on his mathematical perspective:

Personal life
In 1912, Courant married Nelly Neumann, who had earned her doctorate at Breslau in synthetic geometry in 1909.  They lived together in Göttingen until they were divorced in 1916.  She was later murdered by the Nazis in 1942 for being Jewish.

In 1919, Courant married Nerina (Nina) Runge (1891–1991), a daughter of the Göttingen professor for Applied Mathematics, Carl Runge (of Runge–Kutta fame).

Richard and Nerina had four children: Ernest, a particle physicist and innovator in particle accelerators; Gertrude (1922–2014), a PhD biologist and wife of the mathematician Jürgen Moser (1928–1999); Hans (1924-2019 ), a physicist who participated in the Manhattan Project; and Leonore (known as "Lori," 1928–2015), a professional violist and wife of the mathematician Jerome Berkowitz (1928–1998) and subsequently wife of mathematician Peter Lax until her death.

Publications

 (archive) (translated from German: Methoden der mathematischen Physik I, 2nd ed, 1931)

 (translated from German: Methoden der mathematischen Physik II, 1937)

References

Sources

External links

 
 
 Biographical memoir – by Peter Lax
 Oral History interview transcript with Richard Courant on 9 May 1962, American Institute of Physics, Niels Bohr Library & Archives
National Academy of Sciences Biographical Memoir
2015 Video Interview with Hans Courant by Atomic Heritage Foundation Voices of the Manhattan Project
US News Rankings of Applied Mathematics Programs

1888 births
1972 deaths
20th-century American mathematicians
20th-century German mathematicians
German military personnel of World War I
Mathematical analysts
Mathematics popularizers
Foreign Members of the USSR Academy of Sciences
Jewish emigrants from Nazi Germany to the United States
Silesian Jews
University of Göttingen alumni
Academic staff of the University of Münster
Academics of the University of Cambridge
New York University faculty
People associated with the University of Zurich
University of Breslau alumni
People from the Province of Silesia
People from Lubliniec
Scientists from New Rochelle, New York
Textbook writers
Knights Commander of the Order of Merit of the Federal Republic of Germany
Fluid dynamicists
Mathematicians from New York (state)
Jewish scientists
Fellows of the American Physical Society
Members of the American Philosophical Society